Thomas Charles Bigge (1739–1794) was an English landowner and banker, High Sheriff of Northumberland for 1771.

Life
He was the son of William Bigge (1707–1758). of Benton House, Little Benton, Northumberland. He enrolled at Christ Church, Oxford in 1757.

Bigge was a member of the Roman Club founded in 1765 by Edward Gibbon. He was buried in the church of Weston, Bath, where there were memorials to two of his daughters.

Family

Bigge married Jemima Ord, daughter of William Ord of Fenham—who had also served as High Sheriff of Northumberland—in 1747. They had four sons and six daughters.

The eldest son Charles (1773–1849), appointed High Sheriff of Northumberland in 1802
William Edward, who died young
Thomas Hanway, banker, died 1824
John (1780–1843) was called to the Bar in 1806 and in 1813 was appointed Chief Justice of Trinidad. 
A daughter, Grace Julia (died 1872), married Thomas Christopher Glyn, barrister-at-law, third son of Sir Richard Carr Glyn, 1st Baronet.

References

1794 deaths
High Sheriffs of Northumberland
Year of birth unknown
1739 births